In mathematics, the permutation category is a category where
the objects are the natural numbers,
the morphisms from a natural number n to itself are the elements of the symmetric group  and
there are no morphisms from m to ''n if .

It is equivalent as a category to the category of finite sets and bijections between them.

References 

Category theory